The Meaning of the 21st Century: A Vital Blueprint for Ensuring Our Future is a 2006 nonfiction book by British technology consultant James Martin.

Synopsis 
It assesses technological challenges, dangers and opportunities facing the human race. The book lists and proposes solutions for 17 interlocked upcoming "megaproblems". Topics include nanotechnology, artificial intelligence, climate change and terrorism. Martin asserts that many global problems have been worsened by past technologies, but could be addressed by new ones. For example, he advocates for "electronic brain appendages" to help think  through to a solution to problems such as global warming.

Film 
Martin released a film based on the book, narrated by one of his Bermudan neighbors, Hollywood actor Michael Douglas. 

References

External links
 Full film

2006 non-fiction books
Futurology books